Gary Hardeman (born 26 February 1950) is a former Australian rules footballer who played for Melbourne in the Victorian Football League (VFL) between the late 1960s and early 1980s.

Hardeman played as a half back and made his senior debut for Melbourne in the 1967 VFL season. He remained with the club until 1977, finishing second in the 1974 Brownlow Medal count and earning All Australian selection for his performance in the 1972 Perth Carnival. After leaving the club at the end of 1977 Hardeman joined Sturt in the South Australian National Football League (SANFL) but returned to Melbourne in 1981 to play for one final season.

Hardeman is only one of four footballers, with Trevor Barker, Geoff Cunningham and Steven Smith, to have played 200 VFL/AFL games but not play a final.

In 2000 he was selected at centre half back in Melbourne's official 'Team of the Century'.

Statistics

|- style="background-color: #EAEAEA"
! scope="row" style="text-align:center" | 1967
|
| 33 || 8 || 1 || 2 || 76 || 13 || 89 || 13 ||  || 0.1 || 0.3 || 9.5 || 1.6 || 11.1 || 1.6 || 
|- 
! scope="row" style="text-align:center" | 1968
|
| 33 || 17 || 21 || 19 || 168 || 25 || 193 || 48 ||  || 1.2 || 1.1 || 9.9 || 1.5 || 11.4 || 2.8 || 
|- style="background-color: #EAEAEA"
! scope="row" style="text-align:center" | 1969
|
| 33 || 19 || 15 || 13 || 248 || 64 || 312 || 62 ||  || 0.8 || 0.7 || 13.1 || 3.4 || 16.4 || 3.3 || 
|- 
! scope="row" style="text-align:center" | 1970
|
| 33 || 22 || 1 || 4 || 337 || 34 || 371 || 96 ||  || 0.0 || 0.2 || 15.3 || 1.5 || 16.9 || 4.4 || 
|- style="background-color: #EAEAEA"
! scope="row" style="text-align:center" | 1971
|
| 33 || 20 || 0 || 1 || 280 || 42 || 322 || 95 ||  || 0.0 || 0.1 || 14.0 || 2.1 || 16.1 || 4.8 || 
|- 
! scope="row" style="text-align:center" | 1972
|
| 33 || 21 || 10 || 6 || 335 || 56 || 391 || 124 ||  || 0.5 || 0.3 || 16.0 || 2.7 || 18.6 || 5.9 || 
|- style="background-color: #EAEAEA"
! scope="row" style="text-align:center" | 1973
|
| 33 || 21 || 6 || 7 || 272 || 63 || 335 || 98 ||  || 0.3 || 0.3 || 13.0 || 3.0 || 16.0 || 4.7 || 
|- 
! scope="row" style="text-align:center" | 1974
|
| 33 || 20 || 11 || 15 || 289 || 100 || 389 || 91 ||  || 0.6 || 0.8 || 14.5 || 5.0 || 19.5 || 4.6 || 
|- style="background-color: #EAEAEA"
! scope="row" style="text-align:center" | 1975
|
| 33 || 21 || 31 || 27 || 288 || 93 || 381 || 70 ||  || 1.5 || 1.4 || 14.4 || 4.7 || 19.1 || 3.5 || 
|- 
! scope="row" style="text-align:center" | 1976
|
| 33 || 20 || 7 || 7 || 279 || 88 || 367 || 75 ||  || 0.4 || 0.4 || 14.0 || 4.4 || 18.4 || 3.8 || 
|- style="background-color: #EAEAEA"
! scope="row" style="text-align:center" | 1977
|
| 33 || 21 || 10 || 4 || 276 || 118 || 394 || 87 ||  || 0.5 || 0.2 || 13.1 || 5.6 || 18.8 || 4.1 || 
|- 
! scope="row" style="text-align:center" | 1981
|
| 11 || 9 || 0 || 0 || 79 || 62 || 141 || 35 ||  || 0.0 || 0.0 || 8.8 || 6.9 || 15.7 || 3.9 || 
|- class="sortbottom"
! colspan=3| Career
! 219
! 113
! 105
! 2927
! 758
! 3685
! 894
! 
! 0.5
! 0.5
! 13.4
! 3.5
! 16.9
! 4.1
! 
|}

Notes

References
 Presentation by Demons, The Age, (Friday, 5 July 1963), p.22.

External links

Demonwiki profile

1950 births
Australian rules footballers from Victoria (Australia)
Melbourne Football Club players
Sturt Football Club players
All-Australians (1953–1988)
Living people